St. Michael is a Lutheran church and parish in Weiden in der Oberpfalz. It belongs to the congregation of St. Michael Weiden in the Weiden Dekanat of the Evangelical-Lutheran Church in Bavaria. It has served both Catholic and Protestant communities during its history and was used as a church for both confessions until 1899. Today, its known for its association with the organist Max Reger.

References

Further reading 
 Georg Dehio: Handbuch der Deutschen Kunstdenkmäler. Bayern V: Regensburg und die Oberpfalz. Deutscher Kunstverlag, Munich, Berlin 2008, ISBN 978-3-422-03118-0, pp. 852–854.

External links 

 
 Daniel Kunert: Die Max-Reger-Gedächtnisorgel der St.-Michael-Kirche Weiden (Oberpfalz) orgel-information.de
 St. Michael, Weiden in der Oberpfalz kulturkirchen.org

Churches in Bavaria